
Hendra is the name of eight hamlets in Cornwall, England, United Kingdom.
Hendra, Breage
Hendra, Camelford
Hendra, Grade-Ruan
Hendra, St Dennis
 Hendra, near Catchall, Sancreed 
Hendra, Stithians
Hendra, Wendron
Hendra, Withiel

Hendra derives from the Cornish "hendre", meaning "home farm". There are also places in Ladock, St Ives, St Just and St Teath called Hendra. It could also mean "old farm".

Hendra Cross
A stone wayside cross was found at Hendra Farm, Menheniot in the early 1960s. It had been buried upside down in the ground to form a gatepost. In 1991 the two separate pieces of the cross were repaired and erected on a new base near Hendra farmhouse.

Another cross sometimes known as Hendra Cross is at a crossroads near Bossiney.

See also

 List of farms in Cornwall
 Charles Henderson (Map Hendra)

References

External links

Hamlets in Cornwall
Farms in Cornwall
Cornwall-related lists